The Yolo County Fair is held in Woodland, California in the middle of August each year, running Wednesday afternoon through Sunday evening. Started in 1935 (current site in 1940), it is the largest free admission fair in the state of California. 

Since there was no fair in 2020 caused by COVID-19 pandemic, the 82nd was deferred to 2021, which went virtual. World War II was the cause of the fair's cancellation between 1942 and 1945.

Events
There are demolition derbies in the fairground's arena, local Future Farmers of America (FFA) exhibits, as well as several other agricultural related competitions and auctions. There are also several exhibition halls where fair-goers can peruse through stands set up by local businesses and groups.  One of the newest and most popular attractions of the county fair is the "Yolo Idol Search" based on the TV show American Idol.

Gallery

References

Yolo County, California
Fairs in California
Annual fairs
Annual events in California
Woodland, California
Tourist attractions in Yolo County, California